Dumitru Nicolae (born 29 April 1943) is a Romanian former footballer who played as a defender.

International career
Dumitru Nicolae played six games at international level for Romania, making his debut in friendly which ended with a 2–1 victory against France. He made two appearances at the Euro 1968 qualifiers and one at the 1970 World Cup qualifiers. He also played two games for Romania's Olympic team at the 1968 Summer Olympics qualifiers.

Honours
Petrolul Ploiești
Cupa României: 1962–63
Steaua București
Divizia A: 1967–68
Cupa României: 1965–66, 1966–67, 1968–69, 1969–70
Sportul Studențesc București
Divizia B: 1971–72

Notes

References

External links
Nicolae Dumitru at Labtof.ro

1943 births
Living people
Romanian footballers
Romania international footballers
Association football defenders
Liga I players
Liga II players
FC Sportul Studențesc București players
FC Petrolul Ploiești players
FC Steaua București players
Romanian taxi drivers